"Wachusett" (also spelled "Wachuset", "Watchusett", and "Watchuset") is a word derived from the Algonquian languages such as Nipmuc and Wompanoag, still spoken by the Native Americans of Massachusetts and is believed to approximate "near the mountain" or "mountain place". Wachusett was originally used as the name of a mountain in Massachusetts; other uses of the word (most of them local) have been derived directly from the name of the mountain.   

Wachusett may refer to:

Mount Wachusett, a mountain in Worcester County, Massachusetts
Wachusett Mountain (ski area), located on the mountain 
Wachusett Mountain State Reservation, the park covering the mountain
A Walk to Wachusett, an essay by Henry David Thoreau about the author's journey to Mount Wachusett

Other geographic features
Wachusett Aqueduct in Massachusetts
Wachusett Dam in Clinton, Massachusetts
Wachusett (MBTA station), a commuter rail station in Fitchburg, Massachusetts
Wachusett Reef, a coral reef in the Pacific Ocean reported in 1899 but never confirmed
Wachusett Reservoir in Worcester County, Massachusetts
Wachusett Street in the Forest Hills (Boston) area of Boston, Massachusetts

Institutions, schools, and organizations

Mount Wachusett Community College in Gardner, Massachusetts
Wachusett Hall at Assumption College
Wachusett Regional High School in Holden, Massachusetts
Wachusett Regional School District in Massachusetts

Businesses
Wachusett Brewing Company in Westminster, Massachusetts
Wachusett Dirt Dawgs, a collegiate summer baseball team in Leominster, Massachusetts
Wachusett Potato Chip Company in Fitchburg, Massachusetts
Wachusett Shirt Company, a historic building in Leominster, Massachusetts

Ships
USS Wachusett (1861), a United States Navy sloop-of-war in commission from 1862 to 1868, from 1871 to 1874, and from 1879 to 1885
USS Wachusett (ID-1840), a United States Navy cargo ship in commission from 1918 to 1919
USS Wachusetts (SP-548), later USS SP-548, a United States Navy patrol vessel in commission from 1917 to 1919